Pascual Gross Pérez (May 17, 1957 – November 1, 2012) was a Dominican professional baseball player who pitched in the Major Leagues for the Pittsburgh Pirates, Atlanta Braves, Montreal Expos, and New York Yankees.

Career
Pérez was signed by scout Neftalí Cruz for the Pittsburgh Pirates organization in 1976. He reached the major league club in 1980. Traded to the Braves on June 30, 1982, he enjoyed his winningest seasons while with that organization, going 15–8 and 14–8 in 1983 and 1984 respectively. His most successful seasons were spent with the Montreal Expos, where he went 28-21 with a 2.80 ERA between 1987 and 1989.

He was arrested for cocaine possession in his native Dominican Republic in January 1984 and spent three months in prison although his ultimate sentence was only a fine of $1,000. He did not rejoin the Braves until May 1984. He often drew the ire of his opponents, using an imaginary finger gun to shoot opponents and would pound the baseball into the ground. While it is customary for pitchers to walk back to the bench after completing an inning, he would run full speed to the dugout (gold chains and long, curly locks bouncing) after an inning-ending strikeout. He eventually added the "Pascual pitch" (his version of the "eephus") to his repertoire. He was also involved in more than one beanball incident, most notably an August 12, 1984 brawl with the San Diego Padres where he hit the Padres' Alan Wiggins with his first pitch leading off the game, inciting each San Diego pitcher in the game to throw at him each time he came to bat. He had just received his driver's license and earned the nicknames "Perimeter Pascual" and "Wrong-Way Perez" after missing a start on August 19, 1982, while circling Atlanta's Interstate 285 (a beltway) three times looking for Atlanta–Fulton County Stadium, he ran out of gas and arrived at the ballpark 10 minutes late.

Released by the Braves on April 1, 1986, he missed the entire 1986 season. After signing a minor league contract with the Expos in 1987, he joined them in August and finished the 1987 season 7–0 with an outstanding 2.30 ERA. His last winning season came the following year when he went 12–8 and posted a 2.44 ERA with the Expos.

Pérez threw a five-inning rain-shortened no-hitter against the Phillies on September 24, 1988. It was the first no-hitter in Veterans Stadium history. Pérez allowed one walk, and another Phillies baserunner reached on an error. Umpire Harry Wendelstedt waved off the game after a 90-minute rain delay after the game was stopped by rain with one out in the top of the sixth. However, due to a statistical rule change in 1991, no-hitters must last at least nine innings to count. As a result of the retroactive application of the new rule, this game and thirty-five others are no longer considered no-hitters.

He was granted free agency in November 1989 and signed with the Yankees. Through 1990 and 1991, he started only 17 games for the Yankees and compiled records of 1–2 and 2–4 respectively. Prior to the 1992 season, he was suspended by Major League Baseball for one year for violating the league's drug policy, a suspension that ended his career. His career record was 67–68.

Two of his brothers, Mélido and Carlos, were also major league pitchers, as was a cousin, Yorkis.

He also was married for 16 years to Maritza Madera Gross and had two daughters, Mariel Gross and Roxanna Gross.

Pascual first made his trademark peek through the legs to check the runner on first in 1979 in the Dominican League.

Death

Pérez was found dead in his bedroom in San Gregorio de Nigua, Dominican Republic, on November 1, 2012, after being hit on the head repeatedly with a hammer in an apparent robbery. He was also stabbed in the neck.

References

External links

1957 births
2012 deaths
2012 crimes in the Dominican Republic
2012 murders in North America
2010s murders in the Dominican Republic
Águilas Cibaeñas players
Albany-Colonie Yankees players
Atlanta Braves players
Charleston Patriots players
China Times Eagles players
Columbus Clippers players
Dominican Republic expatriate baseball players in Canada
Dominican Republic expatriate baseball players in Taiwan
Dominican Republic expatriate baseball players in the United States
Fort Lauderdale Yankees players
Deaths by beating
Deaths by stabbing in the Dominican Republic
Dominican Republic murder victims
Dominican Republic sportspeople in doping cases
Indianapolis Indians players

Major League Baseball pitchers
Major League Baseball players from the Dominican Republic
Major League Baseball players suspended for drug offenses 
Male murder victims
Montreal Expos players
National League All-Stars
New York Yankees players
People from San Cristóbal Province
People murdered in the Dominican Republic
Pittsburgh Pirates players
Portland Beavers players
Richmond Braves players
Salem Pirates players
People convicted of drug offenses
Sportspeople convicted of crimes